"Seven Nation Army" is a song by American rock duo the White Stripes. It is the opening track on their fourth studio album, Elephant (2003). V2 Records released the song to American alternative radio on February 17, 2003, as the lead single from the album. Worldwide, the single was issued through XL Recordings. Written and produced by Jack White, the song consists of distorted vocals, a simple drumbeat, and a bass-like riff created by playing a guitar through a pitch shift effect.

The song charted in multiple countries, and its success contributed to the popularity of the White Stripes and the garage rock revival movement. In addition to praising its riff and drumbeat, critics have ranked "Seven Nation Army" as one of the best songs of the 2000s decade. It won Best Rock Song at the 46th Annual Grammy Awards, and a music video for the song directed by Alex and Martin won Best Editing in a Video at the 2003 MTV Video Music Awards.

"Seven Nation Army" has become a sports anthem, commonly appearing in audience chants in which a series of "oh" sounds or the name of an athlete is sung to the tune of the song's riff. It has also served as a theme song for sports teams, personalities, and events, including the 2018 FIFA World Cup. The song has grown in popularity due to its usage in sports; its riff has been described as "ubiquitous", and the song has experienced increased commercial success, charting intermittently in multiple countries and receiving a gold certification from Germany's Federal Music Industry Association, a platinum certification from the Federation of the Italian Music Industry and a multi-platinum certification from the British Phonographic Industry.

The song has appeared in various media and has been used in political events in the United Kingdom, particularly as a chant sung by audiences. Various artists have covered "Seven Nation Army", including Ben l'Oncle Soul and Marcus Collins, both of whose covers reached charts in multiple countries. Third Man Records issued re-releases of the song in 2014 and 2015.

Recording

"Seven Nation Army" began with a guitar riff written by singer and guitarist Jack White at the Corner Hotel in Melbourne, while the White Stripes were on the Australian leg of their tour in January 2002. He showed the riff to Ben Swank, an executive with the White Stripes' record label Third Man, who felt White could "do better". White later recalled that Swank "didn't even think that rhythm was that great, either". Originally saving the riff for a potential James Bond theme, he decided to incorporate it into a White Stripes song after admitting how slim his chances were of ever being asked to create a Bond theme (Five years later, he would write and perform "Another Way to Die" with Alicia Keys as the theme for the 2008 Bond film Quantum of Solace).

"Seven Nation Army" was produced by White and recorded at Toe Rag Studios in London's Hackney area. He wrote the song as a "little experiment", hoping to create a compelling song that did not include a chorus. The title "Seven Nation Army" was initially used as a placeholder for the track before its lyrics were written, but the name ultimately stuck.

Composition and lyrics

"Seven Nation Army" is characterised as an alternative rock, garage rock, blues rock and punk blues song with a length of three minutes and 52 seconds. According to sheet music published by Universal Music Publishing Group, it is composed in the key of E minor in common time with a tempo of 120 beats per minute. The title of the song comes from when Jack White, as a young child in Detroit, misheard "The Salvation Army" as "The Seven Nation Army".

The song is driven by a riff that resembles the sound of a bass guitar. To create this sound, White connected a semi-acoustic guitar to a DigiTech Whammy pedal (a pitch shift effect), lowering the pitch by an octave. The riff uses five pitches and consists of seven notes; it begins with a held note followed by four syncopated notes, ending with two notes that appear frequently in laments. The 7-note riff of "Seven Nation Army" has been noted to be similar to the main theme (movements 1 and 4) of Bruckner's 5th symphony. The song also features distorted vocals and a "heartbeat drum", played by White Stripes drummer Meg White. AllMusic's Tom Maginnis noted that the song "manipulat[es] the power of tension and release": it creates a sense of "anticipatory energy", then transitions into what Maginnis described as a  crush of what stands for the chorus", consisting of an electric guitar and a "bashing crash cymbal".

John Mulvey of NME described "Seven Nation Army" as a "diatribe against fame". The song's lyrics were inspired by the growing attention received by the White Stripes. According to Jack White, the song tells the story of a person who, upon entering a town, hears its residents gossiping about him and proceeds to leave the town in response. Driven by a sense of loneliness, he ultimately returns. Regarding the song's meaning, White stated, "The song's about gossip. It's about me, Meg and the people we're dating." Maginnis described the lyrics as presenting an "obstinate attitude", citing the opening lines: "I'm gonna fight 'em off / A seven nation army couldn't hold me back / They're gonna rip it off / Taking their time right behind my back".

In regards to the line "I'm going to Wichita / Far from this opera forevermore", White said he has never visited the city, but was using it as metaphor and getting himself into character for the song with the lyric.

Release
Jack White's idea of releasing "Seven Nation Army" as a single faced opposition from the White Stripes' record labels, who wanted to release the song "There's No Home for You Here" instead. Jack White ultimately succeeded in persuading the band's record labels to release "Seven Nation Army", and in 2003 the song was released as a promotional single alongside Elephant track "In the Cold, Cold Night". It was subsequently released as a 7-inch vinyl single and a CD single; the former included a cover of "Good to Me"—written by Brendan Benson and Jason Falkner—as its B-side, while the latter included both "Good to Me" and folk song "Black Jack Davey". The photograph used as the single's artwork was taken by Patrick Pantano; it includes an elephant painting made by Greg Siemasz.

On January 3, 2014, Third Man Records announced a limited edition clear 7-inch vinyl reissue of "Seven Nation Army" as part of a package for subscribers to its Vault service. A black 7-inch vinyl reissue with updated artwork was released on February 27, 2015.

Music video
The video, directed by Alex and Martin, consists of one seemingly continuous shot through a kaleidoscopic tunnel of mirrored black, white and red triangles, touching on Jack's love of the number three. The triangle slides alternate between images of Jack or Meg playing, interspersed with marching skeletons and an elephant, referring to the name of the album "Seven Nation Army" appeared on. The speed at which the triangles move forward through the tunnel speeds up and slows down in unison with the dynamics of the song. During the video, when the song begins to intensify, the lights in surrounding the triangles flash and other effects build up as well.

The music video won Best Editing in a Video at the 2003 MTV Video Music Awards, and it was nominated for Best Group Video, Best Rock Video, and Best Special Effects.

Reception
"Seven Nation Army" received widespread critical acclaim. The song won the Grammy Award for Best Rock Song at the 46th Annual Grammy Awards in addition to being nominated for Best Rock Performance by a Duo or Group with Vocal, and in 2003, it was ranked number three on Pazz & Jop based on music critics' votes. Heather Phares of AllMusic described it as a "breathtaking opener" to the album Elephant, and Bram Teltelman of Billboard suggested that "adventurous rock programmers might want to join the 'Army'". In particular, "Seven Nation Army"'s central riff has been the subject of praise since the song's release. A writer for Rolling Stone described it as the best riff of the 2000s decade, and Rebecca Schiller of NME wrote that the riff is "the most maddeningly compulsive bassline of the decade, and not even actually played on a bass guitar". Critics also praised Meg White's drumming—a "hypnotic thud" according to Tom Maginnis of AllMusic. Teltelman described the drumming as "simple but effective", and Phares said it was "explosively minimal".

Critics distinguished the song from the White Stripes' other work. According to Teltelman, "Seven Nation Army" represented an effort to "defy categorization", especially the garage rock label that had been attributed to the band. He further wrote that it was "much more of a straightforward rock song" than the band's 2002 single "Fell in Love with a Girl". Phares found "Seven Nation Army", along with "The Hardest Button to Button", to "deliver some of the fiercest blues-punk" of any song by the White Stripes, and Alex Young of Consequence of Sound viewed it as the band's best song.

Critics ranked the song among the best tracks of the 2000s decade; it appeared on NME's, Rolling Stone's, WFNX's, and Pitchfork's retrospective lists, and it was placed at number one on Consequence of Sound'''s "Top 50 Songs of the Decade". "Seven Nation Army" appeared on Triple J's greatest songs ranking based on audience votes, and listeners ranked the song number six on BBC Radio 6 Music's "Top 100 Greatest Hits" after being presented with an unranked best songs list that the station had created.

In March 2005, Q magazine ranked "Seven Nation Army" at No. 8 in its list of the 100 Greatest Guitar Tracks. It was also called the 75th greatest hard rock song by VH1. In May 2008, Rolling Stone placed the song at No. 21 in its list of the 100 Greatest Guitar Songs of All Time.

On Rolling Stone's updated version of its The 500 Greatest Songs of All Time in 2010, "Seven Nation Army" was listed at No. 286, and was re-ranked at number 36 in the 2021 edition. Rolling Stone also polled artists, critics and industry insiders in 2018 to create a list of the 100 greatest songs of the 21st century, and the song was placed at No. 3, with its riff described as the greatest of the 21st Century.

The song was listed as the number-one song of the year on the 2003 KROQ Top 106.7.

Commercial performance
On March 8, 2003, "Seven Nation Army" debuted at number 27 on the Billboard Modern Rock chart; on July 16, it peaked at number one, a position it maintained for three weeks. The song entered the Billboard Hot 100 chart on May 24, peaking at 76 that week. It debuted at number 38 on Billboards Mainstream rock chart on July 12, and it reached its peak position of 12 on November 8. In Canada it peaked at number 61 on the Canadian Singles Chart in July 2007.

The song debuted on the UK Singles Chart on May 3, 2003, at number seven, its peak position. It also reached the UK Indie Chart and Scottish Singles Chart the same week. The song debuted on the former at number one and remained at that position for another week, and it debuted and peaked at number six on the latter. On May 1, it debuted on the Irish Singles Chart, where it peaked at number 22. On June 22, the song debuted on the Australian Singles Chart at its peak position of number 17. It debuted on the Official German Charts at number 69 on June 27; it peaked at number four two weeks later.

"Seven Nation Army" continued to chart intermittently years after its release. The song debuted at number four on the Federation of the Italian Music Industry (FIMI) chart on July 27, 2006, and it peaked at number three a week later. On June 29, 2008, it debuted at number 18 on the Swiss Hitparade chart, where it ultimately peaked at number four; it reentered this chart several times afterward, most recently in 2013. The song debuted at number 23 on the Ö3 Austria Top 40 chart on July 4, 2008, and it peaked at number 18 the next week; it later entered the Ö3 Austria Top 75 chart for one week on February 3, 2012. The song also entered the French Singles Chart on multiple occasions from 2013 to 2018, peaking at number 48 on February 23, 2013. It debuted on the Billboard Hot Rock Songs chart on January 18, 2014, peaking at number 12 during its first week.

The song was awarded several certifications in the 2010s. It was certified gold by Germany's Federal Music Industry Association in 2010, indicating over 150,000 sales of the single. In 2013, the British Phonographic Industry awarded "Seven Nation Army" a silver certification; after receiving a gold certification two years later, the song was certified double platinum in 2019 for sales and streams of over 1,200,000. The song was certified gold by the FIMI in 2014; three years later, it received a platinum certification, having sold over 50,000 copies.

Cultural impact
"Seven Nation Army" played a significant role in the White Stripes' popularity. A writer for Rolling Stone described it as a "career-changing hit", and NME'''s Daniel Martin viewed the song as the White Stripes' "defining tune", having sparked the band's transition "from their garage rock beginnings to an entirely new level of acclaim". In addition, "Seven Nation Army" contributed to the garage rock revival movement, becoming the first song in the genre to reach number one on Billboard's Modern Rock chart. After its initial run on music charts, the song—especially its riff—grew in popularity as a result of its usage in sports. In 2012, Deadspin's Alan Siegel described the "riff-turned-anthem" as "ubiquitous", and according to The New Yorker's Alec Wilkinson, the riff "might be the second-best-known guitar phrase in popular music, after the one from 'Satisfaction'". Erik Adams of The A.V. Club attributed the song's popularity to its riff's "simplicity"—a characteristic that he remarked makes the song "instantly familiar" and "instantly memorized"—and Nate Sloan said that the four notes following the riff's first note create a feeling of "urgency that makes [the riff] much more memorable".

The song has also appeared in various other media. On May 9, 2014, during the celebration of the 825th Hamburg Port Anniversary, "Seven Nation Army" was played using the horns of cruise ship  as it entered the harbor. An instrumental cover of the song composed by Ramin Djawadi was included in a 2018 episode of HBO television series Westworld. The song was performed during the final task of The Amazing Race 31 at Hart Plaza in Detroit.

Sporting events

According to Alan Siegel of Deadspin, "Seven Nation Army"'s riff is "an organic part of sports culture". The riff is commonly used in sports audience's chants, in which each note is usually sung using the "oh" sound. This phenomenon has its roots in a UEFA Champions League football match in Italy in October 2003, during which fans of Belgium's Club Brugge KV began singing the riff in a game against Italy's A.C. Milan. They continued the chant after Club Brugge KV striker Andrés Mendoza scored a goal. Club Brugge KV won the game, and the song subsequently became the team's "unofficial sports anthem".

After A.S. Roma won against Club Brugge KV in Belgium in 2006, fans of the former team began to use the riff as a chant, having learned it from the latter. Fans of the Italy national football team proceeded to chant the riff at games leading up to the 2006 FIFA World Cup, and "Seven Nation Army"—known as the "po po po po po" song among Italians—became the team's "unofficial theme". After Italy won the 2006 FIFA World Cup Final, the riff was sung in Rome's streets. Regarding the song's popularity in Italy, Jack White said:
I am honored that the Italians have adopted this song as their own. Nothing is more beautiful in music than when people embrace a melody and allow it to enter the pantheon of folk music.

Not long after Italy won the World Cup, broadcaster Rai capitalised on the song's newfound popularity by using the song as the theme tune to game show Tutto per tutto. The song's usage has since expanded into various other sports settings. By 2007, audiences at the Penn State Nittany Lions' American football games had begun chanting the riff in support of the team; before that the Buffalo Bills had used it as their kickoff song, since then, other American football audiences have chanted the riff as well. Meanwhile, Arrangers' Publishing Company began publishing marching band arrangements of "Seven Nation Army", and the song has since been played by marching bands at various colleges, including Boston College and the University of Southern California. The song has been chanted by NFL fans and played by NBA and NHL teams, and it was once chanted by Formula One racing driver Nico Rosberg. Audiences often replace the "oh"s in the chant with the names of members of sports teams, as with Oh Hyeon-Gyu of Celtic FC, Kevin De Bruyne of Manchester City F.C., Thiago Silva of Chelsea FC, Maxi Moralez and Andrea Pirlo of New York City FC, Santi Cazorla, formerly of Arsenal FC, and Divock Origi of Liverpool F.C.

"Seven Nation Army" has served as an official anthem at various sporting events; NPRs Rick Karr remarked that the song is "arguably... the world's most popular sports anthem". It has been played at each UEFA European Football Championship since 2008, and it was played prior to the start of each game during the 2018 FIFA World Cup. Karr estimated that the song has reached "hundreds of millions of television viewers around the world" as a result of its usage in the latter tournament. Multiple sports teams and personalities have also used "Seven Nation Army" as their official song or walkout music, including boxers Gennady Golovkin and Anthony Joshua, American football teams the Baltimore Ravens and the Detroit Lions, ice hockey team the New Jersey Devils, baseball team the Baltimore Orioles, and darts world champion Michael van Gerwen. The song is also played at the home games of A-League team Melbourne Victory following a team goal; coincidentally, the team plays at AAMI Park- located only  from the Corner Hotel, where the riff was originally composed. Current WWE commentator Pat McAfee used the song as an entrance theme, including for his match against Austin Theory at WrestleMania 38. The song is also played at home games of the NBA team Miami Heat especially as the intro for the starting lineup and intro video, even to this day.

Usage in politics
In 2016, the White Stripes stated via Facebook that they were "disgusted" by the song's appearance in a video supporting Donald Trump's campaign for the 2016 United States presidential election, and they said that they "[had] nothing whatsoever to do with [the] video". Matthew Strauss of Pitchfork was unable to ascertain which video had prompted the post, though he mentioned a fan-made video that "featur[ed] Trump imagery and audio of his speech at the Republican convention, set to 'Seven Nation Army'". This use of Donald Trump in music inspired British composer Ben Comeau to write, in the style of J. S. Bach, a four-part fugue on the riff of "Seven Nation Army" to the words "Donald Trump is a wanker."

"Seven Nation Army" made multiple appearances at events leading up to the 2017 United Kingdom general election. Following a May 2017 speech by then-Labour leader Jeremy Corbyn at the Wirral Live music festival at Prenton Park in Birkenhead, Merseyside, supporters in the audience began to chant "Oh, Jeremy Corbyn" to the tune of the song's riff. This chant was repeated on several occasions in the run-up to the election and afterwards at the 2017 Glastonbury Festival, where Corbyn appeared on the Pyramid stage to introduce Run the Jewels. As a result of the chant's appearance at the Glastonbury Festival, "Seven Nation Army" saw a 16,893% increase in streams, according to music streaming website Deezer.

Names of other politicians, including Labour politician Rebecca Long-Bailey and Conservative politician David Davis, were also chanted to the tune of the song's riff during conferences held for the election. At a People's Assembly protest on July 1, 2017, rock band Wolf Alice performed a cover of the song. Corbyn's name was again widely chanted throughout football games and public gatherings in the run-up to the 2019 general election.

Formats and track listings
7-inch promo
"Seven Nation Army" – 3:52
"In the Cold, Cold Night" – 2:58

7-inch vinyl single, 7-inch vinyl reissue
"Seven Nation Army" – 3:52
"Good to Me" (Brendan Benson/Jason Falkner) – 2:06

CD single and digital download
"Seven Nation Army" – 3:52
"Good to Me" (Brendan Benson/Jason Falkner) – 2:06
"Black Jack Davey" (Traditional) – 5:06

Personnel
Adapted from "Seven Nation Army" 7-inch vinyl reissue liner notes.

The White Stripes
Jack White – vocals, guitar, slide guitar, writing, mixing, production
Meg White – drums

Additional personnel
Liam Watson – mixing
Noel – mastering

Charts

Weekly charts

Year-end charts

Certifications

Release history

Cover versions
The song has been covered by blues musician C. W. Stoneking as well as the country group The Oak Ridge Boys (with bass singer Richard Sterban singing the original guitar riffs), funk metal band Living Colour, rock supergroup Audioslave, indie band Hard-Fi, alternative rock band The Flaming Lips, English indie singer Kate Nash, British soul singer Alice Russell, American singer and television personality Kelly Clarkson, hard rock band The Pretty Reckless, heavy metal band Metallica, Argentine electrotango band Tanghetto, and reggae band The Dynamics. It has also been covered by German artist Mickie Krause, credited as Krausetto. In 2015, it was covered by Haley Reinhart for Scott Bradlee's Postmodern Jukebox in a style reminiscent of a "New Orleans funeral march". French neofolk group SKÁLD covered the song in 2019 for the Alfar Fagrahvél edition of their album Vikings Chant, with minor changes to the lyrics, with the city of "Wichita" changed to "Uppsala".

The song was covered during Maroon 5's Overexposed Tour in 2012, with lead guitarist James Valentine providing guitar and vocals and lead vocalist Adam Levine providing drums. The song was also covered by KT Tunstall (as a medley with her own "Black Horse and the Cherry Tree") on her 2013 Invisible Empire/Crescent Moon tour. European fans of the English pop star Robbie Williams frequently chant the song's riff both before and during a concert; renowned for his call and response relationship with his audience, Williams often improvises lyrics relating to the city in which he is performing, backed by the audience's riff. Thrash metal band Sepultura used the main riff as an outro on Zombie Ritual, a cover by Death. Ramin Djawadi made a cover version of the song with Sitar for Westworld season 2.

The song is also included in the "Backstage Romance" number of Moulin Rouge! (musical), where it is in a medley with Bad Romance, Tainted Love, Toxic, and Sweet Dreams (Are Made of This). During The Bandito Tour, musical duo Twenty One Pilots would sometimes perform the song as a mashup with one of their own songs, Morph.

Glitch Mob remix
The song has been remixed by The Glitch Mob as well, which was used in the first trailer for the 2016 video game Battlefield 1.

The Glitch Mob remix of the song was used in a trailer for the 2013 film G.I. Joe: Retaliation.  It appears as a playable track in Guitar Hero: Warriors of Rock as well as in Guitar Hero Live's online GHTV mode. In 2016, video game company EA used the Glitch Mob remix of the song in a trailer advertising Battlefield 1. A surge in streams and digital sales of the White Stripes' version of "Seven Nation Army" followed the release of the trailer: within two weeks, the total number of streams and digital purchases of the song increased by 146 percent and 332 percent, respectively.

Ben l'Oncle Soul version

French soul singer Ben l'Oncle Soul covered the song on his self-titled album. Released as the album's debut single, "Seven Nation Army" was a commercial success in multiple countries, peaking at number 16 on the Belgium Ultratop Charts for Wallonia and charting in Germany, the Netherlands, and Switzerland. The version was also included in a number of compilation albums, including NRJ Hits 2010 Vol. 2 on Warner Records and Les hits de l'été 2010 on Universal Music Group label.

Charts

Marcus Collins version

British singer and The X Factor 2011 finalist Marcus Collins performed a cover of "Seven Nation Army" based on Ben l'Oncle Soul's cover. A music video for the cover was uploaded to YouTube on February 16, 2012. The song was released as his debut single on March 4, 2012.

Critically, Lewis Corner of Digital Spy noted the "distinctive soul-pop" vocals showcased by Collins and wrote that, "Truth be told, we wish he'd fought a little harder to get one those eight original compositions he has on his forthcoming record out first." Priya Elan of NME concluded that although the cover may have seemed "disturbing in theory", it was ultimately "disposable and forgettable as a McChicken sandwich [...] but not bad". Collins said that he received "a lot of abuse" from White Stripes fans in response to his cover, and he asserted that people should "listen to the original if you don't like my singing".

Track listing

Charts

Release history

Notes and references

Notes

References

External links

White Stripes.net. Retrieved April 14, 2017.
White Stripes.net FAQ Retrieved April 14, 2017.

2003 singles
2002 songs
The White Stripes songs
The Flaming Lips songs
The Oak Ridge Boys songs
2010 debut singles
2012 debut singles
Football songs and chants
FIFA World Cup songs
UK Independent Singles Chart number-one singles
XL Recordings singles
Songs written by Jack White
Grammy Award for Best Rock Song
V2 Records singles
Third Man Records singles
Motown singles
RCA Records singles
Baltimore Ravens
Zella Day songs